Joseph S. Darling Memorial Stadium, located in Hampton, Virginia, serves primarily as a high school football stadium, and also hosts various track-and-field meets, as well as marching band competitions. The 8,000-seat brick facility opened in 1989. 

In 1928, the Darling Estate donated land on Hampton's Victoria Road, exclusively for the use of athletic facilities. The original stadium lasted until 1987, two years before the current stadium opened. The city's four high schools -Bethel, Hampton, Kecoughtan, and Phoebus- each use Darling Stadium for their home football games.

References

Sports venues in Virginia
High school football venues in the United States
American football venues in Virginia
Sports venues in Hampton Roads
Buildings and structures in Hampton, Virginia
1929 establishments in Virginia
Sports venues completed in 1929
Athletics (track and field) venues in Virginia